The Oceanside Stakes is an American Thoroughbred horse race run annually in July at Del Mar Racetrack in Del Mar, California. Raced on turf since 1975, it is restricted to three-year-old non-winners of a $50,000 sweepstakes. The race is contested at a distance of one mile. First run in 1937 as the Oceanside Handicap, through 1939 and again in 1975-76 it was open to horses age three and up. In 1950, the race was restricted to fillies and mares.

Historically a very popular event, the Oceanside was raced in two divisions in 1964, 1977, 1978, 1981, 1982, 1983, 1985, 1987, 1989, 1990, 1991, 1992, 1993, 1994, 1995, 1996, 1997, 1998, 1999, 2000, 2001, 2002, 2003, 2004, 2005, 2006, 2008 and 2012.  In 2007, the number of entrants required it to be run in three divisions. In 2014 and 2015 there was only one division.

The Oceanside Handicap was not run from 1940 through 1948.

Past winners

2016
 Monster Bea (1:35.93) (Gary Stevens)
2015
 Soul Driver (1:35.86) (Mike E. Smith)

2014
 Enterprising (1:33.89) (Mike E. Smith)

2013
 First Division: Gervinho (1:33.88) (Rafael Bejarano)
 Second Division: Rising Legend (1:33.96) (Julien Leparoux)
2012
 First Division: Midnight Crooner (1:34.74) (Rafael Bejarano)
 Second Division: My Best Brother (1:34.39) (Martin Garcia)
2011
 Mr. Commons (1:34.96)
2010
 Twirling Candy (1:34.69)
2009
 Afleet Eagle (1:34.35)
2008
 First Division: Kilderry (1:35.45)
 Second Division: Dixie Chatter (1:35.81)
2007
 First Division: Ten a Penny (1:35.51)
 Second Division: Knockout Artist (1:35.45)
2006
 First Division: Lightning Hit (1:34.12)
 Second Division: Obrigato (1:34.20)
2005
 First Division: Becrux (1:33.91)
 Second Division: El Roblar (1:33.57)
2004
 First Division: Wild Babe (1:34.56)
 Second Division: Blackdoun (1:33.54)
2003
 First Division: Sweet Return (1:33.98)
 Second Division: Devious Boy (1:34.73)
2002
 First Division: Rock Opera (1:34.14)
 Second Division: True Phenomena (1:34.52)
2001
 First Division: Sigfreto (1:35.90)
 Second Division: Dr. Park (1:34.47)
2000
 First Division: Duke of Green (1:35.57)
 Second Division: Stormy Jack (1:36.67)

References

Del Mar Racetrack
Horse races in California
Restricted stakes races in the United States
Turf races in the United States
Flat horse races for three-year-olds
Recurring sporting events established in 1937